Lelio Vincenzo Zucchini (29 October 1915 – 1 March 1986) was an Italian ice hockey player. He competed in the men's tournament at the 1936 Winter Olympics.

References

1915 births
1986 deaths
Ice hockey players at the 1936 Winter Olympics
Olympic ice hockey players of Italy
People from West Springfield, Massachusetts